Chandu the Magician is an American supernatural radio drama which originally aired from 1931–1936. A revival on a different network took place 12 years later, airing from 1948–1950. The series was created by Harry A. Earnshaw (1878–1953) and Raymond R. Morgan. The two series portrayed the adventures of Frank Chandler, also known as Chandu, an American who had learned mystical arts, such as astral projection, which he used to fight criminals and villains, including the evil Baron Roxor. Chandu was Steve Ditko's and Stan Lee's inspiration for the more famous Marvel Comics character Doctor Strange.

Radio version

The original version
Launched in 1931 on KHJ in Los Angeles, the series was soon heard through the West Coast when broadcast on the Don Lee Network. It was then heard, starting in February 1932, over WOR in the East. Nationally, it aired over the Mutual Network beginning on October 8, 1932. The series was sponsored by White King Soap in the West and by Beech Nut Gum in the East.

Gayne Whitman played the lead role of American-born Frank Chandler, who had learned occult secrets from a yogi in India. Known as Chandu, he possessed several supernatural skills, including astral projection, teleportation and the ability to create illusions. Chandu's goal was to "go forth with his youth and strength to conquer the evil that threatens mankind". His sister, Dorothy Regent, was portrayed by Margaret MacDonald.

Cyril Armbrister directed the scripts by Vera Oldham which took Chandu to far-flung locales, both real and mythical. Romantic interludes for Chandu were introduced with Egyptian Princess Nadji (Veola Vonn). Music was first furnished by Felix Mills and then Raymond Paige. According to Veola Vonn, the program was broadcast from the KHJ building on Melrose Avenue; the KHJ building is still standing, although the KHJ studios are no longer in use.

In 1932, Walter Winchell noted: "One of the smaller radio chains has a feature called Chandu, which is Hindu-Chinese for an opium preparation. In fewer wordsdope".
 
In 1935, the production moved to WGN Chicago with a new cast, including Howard Hoffman in the title role and Cornelia Osgood as Dorothy. Her children, Bob and Betty, were played by Olan Soule and Audrey McGrath. When this series came to an end in 1936, WGN's productions of Chandu were transcribed in the Chicago facilities of the World Broadcasting System for use on other stations. In April 1935, they were being broadcast on one other station, WJR in Detroit, Mich.

Revival
Twelve years later, the series was revived on the Mutual–Don Lee Network on June 28, 1948, as a 15-minute weekday program starring Tom Collins as Chandu and Luis van Rooten as the villainous Roxor, plotting world domination. With Howard Culver as the announcer and music by organist Korla Pandit, that series continued until January 28, 1949. The serial continuity was dropped on February 2, 1949 in favor of 30-minute episodes, each with a self-contained storyline, continuing in that format until April 28, 1949. Culver often read commercials with Pandit's organ music in the background.

On October 15, 1949, Chandu the Magician moved to ABC, where it was heard Saturdays at 7:30 pm until June and then on Wednesdays at 9:30 pm. The last broadcast was September 6, 1950.

Film adaptation
In 1932, Chandu the Magician was adapted into a film starring Edmund Lowe as the eponymous character, with Bela Lugosi as Roxor and Irene Ware as Nadji. Strangely, in the later serial The Return of Chandu (1934), Lugosi himself took over the lead role. On February 26, 1934, the "Looking Back" column in the Fairbanks Daily News-Miner noted:

Original series episodes

 03/17/32 #9 Transferred To Egypt
 03/23/32 #13 The Slave Auction
 04/12/32 #27 Important Papers Missing
 04/13/32 #28 Betty & Bob Disappear
 04/20/32 #33 Abdallah Joins Chandu
 04/21/32 #34 Held At Gunpoint
 05/30/32 #61 Finds Hidden Passageway
 05/31/32 #62 Captured By Roxor
 09/12/32 #136 Chandu Warns Nicky
 09/13/32 #137 Betty Reminisces
 09/14/32 #138 Gunfire Heard
 09/30/32 #150 Learns Estaben's Identity
 10/03/32 #151 Nadji Disappears
 10/04/32 #152 Dimitri Defeated
 10/05/32 #153 Exposes Count To Nicholas
 10/06/32 #154 Saves Nadji From Fire
 10/07/32 #155 Leaving After The Fire
 10/11/32 #157 Warns Murderer
 10/12/32 #158 Yogi Warns Chandu
 10/13/32 #159 The Clock Strikes Five
 11/08/32 #177 News Of Robert's Whereabouts
 11/16/32 #183 Will Chandu Save Dorothy
 11/17/32 #184 Magic Fails
 11/18/32 #185 Chandu & Betty Visit Dorothy
 11/21/32 #186 Cobra Decides Fate
 11/22/32 #187 Bob Plans A Swap
 11/23/32 #188 To The Temple
 11/24/32 #189 Robert Returns
 11/25/32 #190 Finds Betty & Bob
 11/28/32 #191 Dr. Shaw & Black Magic
 11/29/32 #192 Nadji Arrives
 11/30/32 #193 Magic Successful
 01/27/33 #235 In Algiers
 01/30/33 #236 Buying Perfume
 01/31/33 #237 Sees Nicholas
 02/01/33 #238 Warning From Chandu
 02/03/33 #240 Motor Trouble
 02/06/33 #241 Family Reunited
 02/07/33 #242 Betty & Bob Sneak Out
 02/08/33 #243 Tells Story
 02/09/33 #244 Note From Dimitri
 02/10/33 #245 Blank Letter
 02/13/33 #246 At Dimitri's Villa
 02/14/33 #247 Driver Flees
 02/15/33 #248 Nicky's Information
 02/16/33 #249 Crystal Smashed
 02/17/33 #250 Snake Charmer
 02/20/33 #251 Discuss Situation
 02/21/33 #252 Locked In Inner Room
 02/22/33 #253 Chandu Recognized
 02/23/33 #254 Note Found
 04/17/33 #291 Water Supply Low
 04/18/33 #292 Crystal Vision Fulfilled
 04/19/33 #293 Nadji Is Murder Suspect
 04/20/33 #294 Cigarette Poison Discovered
 04/21/33 #295 Vindion Spotted
 04/24/33 #296 A Man Looks Like Vindion
 04/25/33 #297 Native Tells A Story
 04/26/33 #298 Aboard The Liner
 04/27/33 #299 The Island Of Lura
 05/01/33 #301 At The Entrance Of The Cave
 05/02/33 #302 Drums Underground
 05/03/33 #303 Bob Explores The Cave
 05/04/33 #304 Nadji Gives Chandu A Warning
 05/05/33 #305 Vindion Talks To His People (Several Skips)

 05/08/33 #306 Nadji Is Convinced She Must Stay
 05/09/33 #307 Vindion Forced To Awaked The Children
 05/10/33 #308 Vindion Tries To Stop Chandu
 05/11/33 #309 Bob Finds Poison And A Letter
 05/17/33 #313 Drawings From Limura
 05/23/33 #317 Nadji Is Afraid Of Vitrius
 05/24/33 #318 In Vitrius' Observatory
 05/25/33 #319 Vitrius' Telescope Is A Radio
 05/26/33 #320 Plans To The Ruined Temple
 05/29/33 #321 Vitrius Changes Plans
 05/30/33 #322 Bob & Betty Worried About Their Mother
 05/31/33 #323 The Temple Of Death
 06/01/33 #324 Vitrius Thought Chandler Was Dead
 07/07/33 #350 Mrs. Regis Meets With Mr. Motleon
 08/21/33 #381 Preparing For The Next Trip
 10/24/34 ## Chandu Warns Nicholas
 10/25/34 ## Betty Reminisces
 10/26/34 ## Gunfire Heard
 10/29/34 ## Estaben's Identity Is Learned
 10/30/34 ## Nadji Disappears
 10/31/34 ## Dimitri Defeated
 11/01/34 ## Exposes Count To Nicholas
 11/02/34 ## Nadji Saved From Fire
 11/06/34 ## Miniature Statue Recovered
 11/08/34 ## Cafe Waiter Is Otto
 11/09/34 ## Yogi Warns Chandu
 11/20/34 ## News Of Robert's Location
 12/19/34 ## Will Chandu Save Dorothy
 12/20/34 ## Magic Fails
 12/21/34 ## Chandu & Betty Visit Dorothy
 12/25/34 ## Bob Plans A Swap
 12/26/34 ## To The Temple
 12/27/34 ## Robert Returns
 12/28/34 ## Bob & Betty Found
 12/31/34 ## Dr Shaw & Black Magic
 12/22/34 ## Cobra Decides Fate
 01/01/35 ## Nadji Arrives
 01/02/35 ## Magic Successful
 06/24/35 ## Adrift at Sea
 06/25/35 ## Poison Death
 06/26/35 ## Nadji Is Accused
 06/27/35 ## Cigarettes Of Death
 06/28/35 ## Rescue at Sea
 07/01/35 ## The Island Of Suva
 07/02/35 ## MrWilson's Charter Boat
 07/03/35  ## The Footprint
 07/04/35  ## Vindion Strikes
 07/06/35  ## The Search For Nadji
 07/07/35  ## Desertion
 07/09/35  ## The Cave
 07/11/35  ## Reunited
 07/12/35  ## Another Encounter
 07/15/35  ## Rescued
 07/16/35  ## The Power Of Chandu
 07/17/35  ## The Awakening
 07/18/35  ## Wilson's Mission
 07/23/35  ## The Palace Of The Secret Star
 07/30/35  ## A Mental Picture
 07/31/35  ## Rescued Again
 08/01/35  ## The Devious Plot
 08/02/35  ## Beware Of Vitrius
 08/05/35  ## Marshall Is Captured
 08/06/35  ## A Message In Code
 08/07/35  ## Clash Of The Wizards
 08/08/35  ## Chandu Victorious
 09/13/35  ## Ruby Mine In Burma

Revival episodes

 06/28/48 # 1 Chandler Returns
 06/29/48 # 2 Secret Papers Missing
 06/30/48 # 3 Is Regent Alive?
 07/01/48 # 4 In Alexandria
 07/02/48 # 5 Dorothy Disappears
 07/05/48 # 6 Search For Dorothy
 07/06/48 # 7 Slave Auction Rescue
 07/07/48 # 8 To Cairo
 07/08/48 # 9 Blue Flame
 07/09/48 # 10 Secret Place
 07/12/48 # 11 Note From Nadji
 07/13/48 # 12 Betty Meets Abdullah
 07/14/48 # 13 Chandu Meets Nadji
 07/15/48 # 14 Betty Is Kidnapped
 07/19/48 # 15 Betty Is Found
 07/20/48 # 16 Roxor Meets Nadji
 07/21/48 # 17 Secret Entrance
 07/22/48 # 18 Spell On Dorothy
 07/23/48 # 19 Crystal Ball
 07/26/48 # 20 Breaking The Spell
 07/27/48 # 21 Betty & Bob Disappear
 07/28/48 # 22 Secret Door
 07/29/48 # 23 Roxor Threatens Death
 07/30/48 # 24 Bob Rescued
 08/02/48 # 25 Abdullah Disappears
 08/03/48 # 26 Emerald Casket
 08/04/48 # 27 Disappearing Ink
 08/05/48 # 28 Looking For Casket
 08/06/48 # 29 Sick Camel
 08/09/48 # 30 Trouble With Guides
 08/10/48 # 31 Low Water Supply
 08/11/48 # 32 Abdullah's Affections
 08/12/48 # 33 Gordon Douglas
 08/13/48 # 34 Douglas' Dinner
 08/16/48 # 35 Douglas Is An Imposter
 08/17/48 # 36 Finding A Letter
 08/18/48 # 37 Nile Cruise
 08/19/48 # 38 Chandu's Disguise
 08/20/48 # 39 Manuscript Found
 08/23/48 # 40 Douglas Tells Roxor
 08/24/48 # 41 Letter Arrives
 08/25/48 # 42 Roxor's Plans
 08/26/48 # 43 Fraud's Identity
 08/27/48 # 44 Abdullah Stabbed
 08/30/48 # 45 Inquest Planned
 08/31/48 # 46 Douglas Disappears
 09/01/48 # 47 Lost In The Catacombs
 09/02/48 # 48 Chandu's Rescue
 09/03/48 # 49 Roxor Is Alive
 09/06/48 # 50 Chandu Escapes
 09/07/48 # 51 Reaching The Ruins
 09/08/48 # 52 Judy Allen
 09/09/48 # 53 Torture Chamber
 09/10/48 # 54 Story Teller
 09/13/48 # 55 Cairo Restaurant
 09/14/48 # 56 Robert's Ring
 09/15/48 # 57 Arenia The Spider
 09/16/48 # 58 Curse On Betty
 09/17/48 # 59 Ben Ali's House
 09/20/48 # 60 Opening The Letter
 09/21/48 # 61 Sonya Shoots Nadji
 09/22/48 # 62 Betty & Bob Run
 09/23/48 # 63 Arenia Is Shot
 09/24/48 # 64 Message For Nadji
 09/27/48 # 65 Mirror Of Life
 09/28/48 # 66 Roxor Is Killed
 09/29/48 # 67 Exploring The Garden
 09/30/48 # 68 Family Is Reunited
 10/01/48 # 69 Explosion
 10/04/48 # 70 Contacts Dorothy
 10/05/48 # 71 Gardener Recognized
 10/06/48 # 72 Bribery Attempt
 10/07/48 # 73 Secret Meeting
 10/08/48 # 74 Landmark Spotted
 10/11/48 # 75 Map Found
 10/12/48 # 76 Fortune Told
 10/13/48 # 77 Dancing Partner Recognized
 10/14/48 # 78 Meets Dimitri
 10/15/48 # 79 Spell Cast On Bob
 10/18/48 # 80 Gypsy Coming After Betty & Bob
 10/19/48 # 81 Dimitri Asked To Leave
 10/20/48 # 82 Castle Plans Found
 10/21/48 # 83 Warning From Nadji
 10/22/48 # 84 Advice For Nicholas

 10/25/48 # 85 Tells About Plans
 10/26/48 # 86 Spell Cast
 10/27/48 # 87 Nadji Told Of Curse
 10/28/48 # 88 Looking For Dorothy
 10/29/48 # 89 Finding Dorothy's Hat
 11/01/48 # 90 Nicholas Has Disappeared
 11/02/48 # 91 Trying To Escape
 11/03/48 # 92 Thinks Nicholas Is In The Castle
 11/04/48 # 93 Nicholas Found
 11/05/48 # 94 Dwarf Spotted
 11/08/48 # 95 Chandler Admits Real Mission
 11/09/48 # 96 To Go To Schmitar Mountain
 11/10/48 # 97 Call From Paris
 11/11/48 # 98 Threat From Dimitri
 11/12/48 # 99 Stranger Spotted
 11/15/48 #100 Fortune Told
 11/16/48 #101 Chandler Trapped
 11/17/48 #102 Enters Cave
 11/18/48 #103 Learns Estaben's Identity
 11/19/48 #104 Influences Dimitri
 11/22/48 #105 Metso's Killed
 11/23/48 #106 Spell Broken
 11/24/48 #107 Threat From Dwarf
 11/25/48 #108 Nadji Arrives
 11/26/48 #109 Fire
 11/29/48 #110 Chandler Escapes Fire
 11/30/48 #111 Forged Letter
 12/01/48 #112 Nadji Leaves
 12/02/48 #113 Lupu Arrives
 12/03/48 #114 Chandler Discovered
 12/06/48 #115 Reveals Himself As Chandu  (Dropout)
 12/07/48 #116 Kingdom Regained
 12/08/48 #117 Phone Call From Robert
 12/09/48 #118 Lab Emptied
 12/10/48 #119 Gomez Spotted
 12/13/48 #120 Robert Seen In Crystal
 12/14/48 #121 Learns Roxor's Location
 12/15/48 #122 Wants To Enter Village Of The Lost
 12/16/48 #123 Jeff Worried
 12/17/48 #124 Warned About Jeff
 12/20/48 #125 Jeff's New Mission
 12/21/48 #126 House In The Desert
 12/22/48 #127 Saved From Spider
 12/23/48 #128 Jeff Found
 12/24/48 #129 Tries To Contact Robert
 12/27/48 #130 Imposter Found Out
 12/28/48 #131 Robert Found
 12/29/48 #132 Story Told
 12/30/48 #133 Looking For Betty
 12/31/48 #134 Dorothy In Temple
 01/03/49 #135 Talks To Chief
 01/04/49 #136 Fate To Be Decided Soon
 01/05/49 #137 Fails Cobra Test
 01/06/49 #138 Refuses Escape Plan
 01/07/49 #139 Robert Returns
 01/10/49 #140 Truth About Dr. Shaw
 01/11/49 #141 Help From Yogi
 01/12/49 #142 Murderer Revealed
 01/13/49 #143 Dorothy Safe
 01/14/49 #144 Planning Tiger Hunt
 01/17/49 #145 Tiger Killed
 01/18/49 #146 Saves Lao Sing (Faulty)
 01/19/49 #147 In Calcutta
 01/20/49 #148 Dinner Invitation
 01/21/49 #149 Dr. Shaw In Calcutta
 01/24/49 #150 Under Dr. Shaw's Influence
 01/25/49 #151 Impersonates Chandler
 01/26/49 #152 Bob Missing
 01/27/49 #153 Strange Markings
 01/28/49 #154 Frank Returns To India
 02/03/49 # 1 The Black Steps
 02/10/49 # 2 The Village Of Thieves
 02/17/49 # 3 Man With The Photographic Memory
 02/24/49 # 4 The Brotherhood Of The Blood Oath
 03/03/49 # 5 The Spell Of Dimitri
 03/10/49 # 6 Framed For Drug Smuggling
 03/17/49 # 7 The Temple At Karnak
 03/24/49 # 8 Temple Under The Sea
 03/31/49 # 9 The House Of Fear
 04/14/49 #11 The Voice Of Darkness
 04/21/49 #12 The Ominous Sahara
 04/28/49 #13 The Fog On The Forgotten Valley
 07/26/50 Rocket Sabotage
 08/02/50 Clever Jeff Adams
 08/09/50 Henry the Dress Designer
 08/16/50 Black Market Hi-Jackers

References

External links
Zoot Radio, free old time radio show downloads of Chandu the Magician

American radio dramas
Astral projection in popular culture
Fantasy radio programs
Mutual Broadcasting System programs
1930s American radio programs
1931 radio programme debuts
1950 radio programme endings
ABC radio programs
1940s American radio programs
1950s American radio programs